Def Leppard are  an English rock band formed in 1977 in Sheffield as part of the new wave of British heavy metal movement. The following is a complete list of all official members, session musicians, featured artists, touring musicians, and live guests of Def Leppard's career

Def Leppard evolved from Atomic Mass after vocalist Joe Elliott joined Atomic Mass in November 1977. The lineup of Elliott, drummer Tony Kenning, bassist Rick Savage, and guitarist Pete Willis was completed by the addition of guitarist Steve Clark in January 1978. The band would play their first show on 18 July of the same year before recording their first EP in the fall after the departure of Kenning.

The departure of Kenning having left the drummer position open, Rick Allen joined the band in November 1978 and has been the full-time drummer ever since, despite the loss of his left arm in a car accident on 31 December 1984. Def Leppard recorded On Through the Night and High 'n' Dry as the five piece of Savage, Willis, Elliott, Clark, and Allen before Pete Willis was fired in July 1982. Willis was replaced by Phil Collen of Girl, and the band went on to the most commercially successful period of their career, the releases of Pyromania and Hysteria.

On 8 January 1991, during a leave of absence from the band, guitarist Steve Clark was found dead in his home. Savage, Elliott, Allen, and Collen recorded their next album Adrenalize as a four-piece before Vivian Campbell joined as a second guitarist. The lineup of Def Leppard has not changed since Campbell joined the band on 15 April 1992, and is thus the longest standing lineup of the band since its incarnation. The current lineup has released four compilations, two live albums, and six studio albums in the time since, most recently the self-titled, Def Leppard, on 30 October 2015.

Members

Current members

Former members

Timeline

Lineups

Session musicians

Touring musicians

Atomic Mass members
This is a list of members of Atomic Mass, which became Def Leppard shortly after Joe Elliott joined the band in November 1977. Only Savage, Kenning, Willis, Elliott became members of Def Leppard.

See also
Def Leppard discography
List of awards and nominations received by Def Leppard

References

External links
Official Def Leppard website

Def Leppard